Pareuthria chlorotica is a species of sea snail, a marine gastropod mollusk in the family Cominellidae.

Description

Distribution
This marine species occurs off Kerguelen.

References

 Fraussen, K. (2010). Buccinidae checklist. Pers. Com.

External links
 Martens, E. von. (1878). Ueber einige Conchylien aus den kälteren Meeresgegenden der südlichen Erdhälfte. Sitzungs-Berichte der Gesellschaft naturforschender Freunde zu Berlin 1878: 20–26
 Griffiths, H.J.; Linse, K.; Crame, J.A. (2003). SOMBASE - Southern Ocean mollusc database: a tool for biogeographic analysis in diversity and evolution. Organisms Diversity and Evolution. 3: 207–213

Cominellidae
Gastropods described in 1878
Taxa named by Eduard von Martens